Enteromius anema is a species of ray-finned fish in the genus Enteromius.

It is widespread in Africa, being found in Cameroon, Central African Republic, Chad, Egypt, Ethiopia, Guinea, Mali, Nigeria, South Sudan and Sudan. It grows to a length of about 5 cm.

References

Enteromius
Taxa named by George Albert Boulenger
Fish described in 1903